Sorenson may refer to:

 Sorensen, a surname
 Sorenson codec, digital video coder-decoder
 Sorenson Glacier, Antarctica